De Arcangelis is an Italian surname. Notable people with the surname include:

Augusto De Arcangelis (born 1868), Italian painter
Lucilla de Arcangelis, Italian physicist
Riccardo De Arcangelis, Italian mathematician, winner of the Vinti Prize

Italian-language surnames